The Review of Income and Wealth is a peer-reviewed academic journal published by Wiley-Blackwell on behalf of the International Association for Research in Income and Wealth. It was established in 1951 and published annually until 1966, when it became a quarterly. Its aim is to provide a venue for research on income and wealth in terms of national and international, economic and social accounting. Its scope includes research on the "development of concepts and definitions for measurement and analysis", the development and "integration of systems of economic and social statistics", and "related methodological problems", and also more applied areas such as international comparisons and the use of economic and social accounting for "budgeting and policy analysis" in different economies.

The editors of the Review are Conchita D'Ambrosio (University of Luxembourg), Robert J. Hill (University of Graz), and Stephan Klasen (University of Göttingen), and its previous editors have included Erik Lundberg, Simon Kuznets, Richard Stone, Raymond Goldsmith, Phyllis Deane, and Colin Clark.

The IARIW offers the Kendrick Prizes, named for John Whitefield Kendrick for the best articles published each year in the Review.

References

External links 
 
 International Association for Research in Income and Wealth

Economics journals
Publications established in 1951
Wiley-Blackwell academic journals
English-language journals
Quarterly journals